Life Below Zero (styled as Life Below Zero° on the title card) is a documentary television series which illustrates the daily and seasonal activities of subsistence hunters as they make their living in remote areas of Alaska. Produced by BBC Studios, the show airs on National Geographic.

As of March 18, 2023, IMDB lists 230 episodes.

Plot
The show follows people living in the remote areas of Alaska, surviving off the land, making money through various ventures, as well as dealing with the many different challenges that come with living so remotely in such an unforgiving environment.

Main characters
Sue Aikens – a -year-old (born July 1, 1963) woman and the sole resident of the Kavik river camp in northern Alaska. The camp is located directly adjacent to the Kavik River, 197 miles north of the Arctic Circle. Her motto is "If it hurts, don't think about it."
Chip and Agnes Hailstone – live with their seven children on the Kobuk River in Noorvik 19 miles north of the Arctic Circle. Chip lived in Kalispell, Montana, before moving to Alaska. Agnes is Native Alaskan, an Inupiaq born in Noorvik, and is the one member of the cast who has spent their entire life in Alaska, as well as the longest-resident. She has family ties to the land that extend thousands of years and knowledge that has been passed down from generation to generation. Although Agnes is more the focus of the Hailstones' segments, her whole family comes to the screen with her.
Glenn Villeneuve – moved from Burlington, Vermont, to Alaska in 1999. He lives alone in Chandalar, 200 miles north of Fairbanks, Alaska, and 65 miles north of the Arctic Circle. Later he is joined by his wife and children.
Jessie Holmes – lives in Brushkana, Alaska, where he is a fisherman, hunter and dogsled racer living alone with his 40 sled dogs.
Andy Bassich – lives on the Yukon River near Eagle, Alaska, with his 25 sled dogs. He came to Alaska after moving from Washington, D.C., with his wife, Kate Bassich.  Andy and Kate divorced in 2016. Andy's girlfriend, Denise, has now joined him at his homestead.
Erik and Martha Mae Salitan – a young couple, well versed in wilderness living, who live 67 miles north of the Arctic Circle in Wiseman, Alaska.
Ricko DeWilde – an Alaskan Athabaskan who moves into his family's remote abandoned cabin near Huslia, Alaska. Later, he has his young children visit to begin teaching them about subsistence living.

Broadcast
The show premiered on Sunday night. It switched to Tuesday night beginning in Season 4. It currently shows on Tuesday at 8 p.m. Eastern Time.

Awards and nominations

References

External links
Official National Geographic website

2013 American television series debuts
2010s American documentary television series
English-language television shows
National Geographic (American TV channel) original programming
Primetime Emmy Award-winning television series
Television series by BBC Studios
Television shows set in Alaska